John and Michael is a 2004 animated short by Shira Avni about two men with Down syndrome who share a loving relationship.

The film was animated with clay backlit on plexiglas, to produce a stained glass effect. Avni made over 14,000 paintings to create the film. It is narrated by Brian Davis, who is himself intellectually disabled. John and Michael was co-produced by Avni and Michael Fukushima of the National Film Board of Canada.

Awards
John and Michael received a dozen awards and honours at film festivals, including a Golden Sheaf Award for best Animation, the award for best original screenwriting at the Inside Out Film and Video Festival, the short documentary award at DOXA Documentary Film Festival, the short film award at the Pink Apple film festival, a Silver Remi Award at the WorldFest-Houston International Film Festival as well as the award for best animated short at the Cinequest Film Festival.
 an Honorable Mention at the Lesbian & Gay Film Festival
October 13 to 22 2006, Seattle - USA
 the Jury Prize - Category: Shorts at the OutFlix Film Festival - International GLBT Film Festival
August 4 to 10 2006, Memphis - USA
 the Golden Sheaf Award - Category: Animation at the Golden Sheaf Awards /Short Film and Video Festival
May 25 to 28 2006, Yorkton - Canada
 the Doxa Short Documentary Award at the Doxa - Documentary Film and Video Festival
May 23 to 28 2006, Vancouver - Canada
 the JWR Award for Best Original Screenwriting at the Inside Out Toronto Lesbian and Gay Film and Video Festival
May 18 to 28 2006, Toronto - Canada
 the Short Film Award at the Pink Apple Film Festival
May 4 to 21 2006, Zurich - Switzerland
 the Silver Remi Award at the WorldFest - International Film Festival
April 21 to May 1, 2006, Houston - USA
 the Award for Best Animated Short at Cinequest
March 1 to 12 2006, San Jose - USA
 the Award - Category: Animation 10 – 30 minutes on a theme of disability Picture This Film Festival
February 6 to 10 2006, Calgary - Canada
 the Special Distinction Award by Jury Classe L CAV Rencontres Internationales du Cinéma d'Animation
November 14 to 22 2005, Wissembourg - France
 an Honorable Mention - Catégorie: Arts at the International Film and Video Festival
November 9 to 13 2005, Columbus - USA
 Best Animated Short Award at the Q Cinema: Fort Worth's Gay & Lesbian International Film Festival
May 19 to 22 2005, Fort Worth - USA

References

External links
Watch John and Michael at NFB.ca
Film collection at NFB

Gay-related films
2004 films
Canadian LGBT-related short films
Documentary films about Down syndrome
Documentary films about gay men
LGBT-related animated films
Quebec films
National Film Board of Canada animated short films
Fictional LGBT couples
Films shot in Montreal
Clay animation films
2004 LGBT-related films
2000s animated short films
2004 animated films
2004 documentary films
2000s stop-motion animated films
2000s English-language films
2000s Canadian films